Malesherbia deserticola is a subshrub native to the deserts and dry shrublands of Antofagasta and Atacama Chile. It can reach heights of 40 cm and has white racemose flowers.

References 

deserticola